"Differences" is an R&B song by American singer Ginuwine. It was written by the artist alongside producer Troy Oliver and recorded for his third studio album, The Life (2001). Released as the album's second single, the ballad spent four weeks at number-one on the US Hot R&B/Hip-Hop Songs chart and peaked at number four on the Billboard Hot 100. It was ranked at number 50 and number 68 in the 2001 and 2002 on Billboard Year-End lists, respectively, and was eventually certified gold by the Recording Industry Association of America (RIAA). American rapper Pop Smoke sampled the song on his hit track released in 2020, "What You Know Bout Love".

Background
"Differences" was written by Ginuwine along with Troy Oliver, while production was helmed by the latter. In an interview with Blogcritics, Ginuwine commented on the background to the track: "That song was really during a time when I was going through a depressed state because of my dad and my mom had passed. We're writing a whole bunch of songs [...] I said, "I'm going to write a song about [my wife]," and it happened to be a song that a lot of people wanted to sing to their wives when they were getting married. It's just one of those songs that will always be here. I'm just happy I'm the one that did it."

Chart performance
Released as the second single from The Life, "Differences" peaked at number one on the US Hot R&B/Hip-Hop Songs chart in the week ending October 6, 2001, becoming his second single to do so. A precedent on the chart, it became the first track on the chart to reach the summit without a physical single being available at retail in an configuration.

Music video
A music video for "Differences" was directed by Hype Williams. A special effects-heavy clip, Ginuwine elaborated on the video shooting in an interview with MTV News: "Actually, the game plan going into [the shoot] was [to] talk to God. Williams was like, 'Look man this gotta be heartfelt. People gotta know you mean this.' He was saying, 'The only way they're gonna know you're meaning it is if you close your eyes and you just talk to God.' I was very skeptical about it 'cause I was just [in front of] a green screen all day. I just had to imagine – he was just telling me what is gonna be where."

Track listing

Notes
 denotes additional producer

Charts

Weekly charts

Year-end charts

Certifications

References

External links
Music video at MTV.com

2001 singles
Ginuwine songs
Music videos directed by Hype Williams
2000 songs
Songs written by Ginuwine
Songs written by Troy Oliver
Contemporary R&B ballads